Caligavis is a genus of honeyeaters endemic to New Guinea and Australia. It includes former members of Lichenostomus, and was created after a molecular phylogenetic analysis published in 2011 showed that the original genus was polyphyletic.

Species
The genus contains three species:

The name Caligavis was first proposed by the English-born ornithologist Tom Iredale in 1956. The word is derived from the Latin caligo meaning obscurity and avis bird.

References

 
Bird genera